The National Football League Second Division (NFL 2nd Division) was a league competition featuring football clubs from India. Founded in 1997 through the All India Football Federation (AIFF), the NFL was the inaugural second division football league in India to be organized on a national scale. The NFL Second Division was eventually replaced by the I-League 2nd Division for the 2007–08 season.

Clubs
More than 120 different professional and semi-professional clubs played in the league from the beginning in 1997-98 to last season 2006-07.

Champions

Promoted teams 

Notes

See also

 Indian National Football League
 Indian Super Cup (1997–2011)
 Indian Super League
 I-League
 Super Cup

References

 
Defunct football leagues in India
Sports leagues established in 1996
Organizations disestablished in 2007
Professional sports leagues in India
India
Football leagues in India